Megastachya is a genus of African plants in the grass family.

 Species
 Megastachya madagascariensis (Lam.) Chase  - Madagascar
 Megastachya mucronata (Poir.) P.Beauv. - Madagascar, South Africa, Cameroon, Ethiopia, Central African Republic, Gabon, Kenya, Malawi, Zambia, Tanzania, etc.

 Formerly included
numerous species once regarded as part of Megastachya but now considered better suited to other genera: Catapodium Desmostachya Distichlis Enteropogon Eragrostis Glyceria Halopyrum Leptochloa Poa

References

Poaceae genera
Grasses of Africa
Taxa named by Palisot de Beauvois
Panicoideae